Bogosia is a genus of bristle flies in the family Tachinidae. There are about nine described species in Bogosia.

Species
These nine species belong to the genus Bogosia:
 Bogosia antinorii Rondani, 1873 c g
 Bogosia argentea Barraclough, 1985 c g
 Bogosia bequaerti Villeneuve, 1913 c g
 Bogosia curvaverpa Barraclough, 1985 c g
 Bogosia grahami Barraclough, 1985 c g
 Bogosia helva (Wiedemann, 1818) c g
 Bogosia minor (Villeneuve, 1913) c
 Bogosia rogezensis Barraclough, 1985 c g
 Bogosia taeniata (Wiedemann, 1824) c g
Data sources: i = ITIS, c = Catalogue of Life, g = GBIF, b = Bugguide.net

References

Further reading

External links

 
 

Tachinidae